Ourém is a municipality in the state of Pará in the Northern region of Brazil.

The unclassified extinct Gambela language was spoken near Ourém.

See also
List of municipalities in Pará

References

Municipalities in Pará